My Best Friend Anne Frank is a 2021 Dutch drama film directed by Ben Sombogaart. The film tells the story of the friendship between Hanneli Goslar and Anne Frank and the story is told from Goslar's perspective. The film is based on Memories of Anne Frank: Reflections of a Childhood Friend written by American author Alison Leslie Gold. It is the first Dutch cinema film about the life of Anne Frank. Aiko Beemsterboer plays the role of Anne Frank and Josephine Arendsen plays the role of Hanneli Goslar.

The film won the Golden Film award in October 2021 after having sold 100,000 tickets.

Part of the film was filmed in Hungary.

The film is being distributed by Netflix internationally with it premiering on February 1, 2022.

It is rated as 63% on Rotten Tomatoes.

Cast 
Anne - Aiko Beemsterboer

Hannah - Josephine Arendsen

Vader Frank - Stefan de Walle

Fritz - Zsolt Trill

Officer Bruno - Björn Freiberg 

Moeder Goslar - Lottie Hellingman

References

External links 
 
 

2021 films
2021 drama films
Dutch drama films
2020s Dutch-language films
Films about Anne Frank
Films shot in Amsterdam
Films shot in Hungary
Films set in Amsterdam
Films directed by Ben Sombogaart